Andriy Vasylyovych Ivanov (October 28, 1888 – June 10, 1927) was a Russian-Ukrainian, Communist Party activist and politician.

Ivanov was born in a village of Kukshevo, Imperial Russia (now in Kostroma Oblast, Russia). In 1906, he became a member of the Bolshevik faction of the Russian Social Democratic Labour Party and was a party worker in Vladimir Governorate and Moscow city.

In 1916, he worked at the Kiev Arsenal factory as the party agitator. After the February Revolution he became the head of the Kiev Governorate Executive Committee, a member of the Russian Social Democratic Labour Party and a delegate of the VI Party Congress. He was a member of the Kiev revolutionary committee revkom during the Kiev Bolshevik Uprising and the Kiev Arsenal January Uprising. At the same time from December 1917 he was a member of the Ukrainian Central Executive Committee (CIK) and from March 1918 - a member of its Presidium.

In 1918, he worked in the Central Committee of the Communist Party (Bolsheviks) of the Ukraine. In February 1919, he was appointed head of the Kiev Governorate, and then the Kharkov Governorate and after that the Odessa Governorate Executive Committee. He was the member of the Presidium and the secretary of the All-Ukrainian Central Executive Committee and the delegate of the XII and XIII Party Congresses. At the XIII Party Congress he was elected as a candidate member of the Central Committee of the Russian Communist Party (b).

In 1925, he became a member of the Central Executive Committee of the Soviet Union and last years of his life were spent in Moscow. During this time he was the member of the Presidium of the Central Executive Committee, the deputy to a head of the budget commission, the secretary of union council, and the deputy of a director of the Institute of Soviet Construction.

He is buried in Mariinskyi Park in Kyiv (previously called Kiev). In Kyiv, a monument to him was erected and a street named after him in 1927-1940 (today's ).

See also
 List of mayors of Kharkiv

References

1888 births
1927 deaths
People from Kostroma Oblast
People from Kostroma Governorate
Old Bolsheviks
Russian Social Democratic Labour Party members
Soviet politicians
Soviet interior ministers of Ukraine
Russian communists
Russian Marxists
Ukrainian politicians before 1991
Politburo of the Central Committee of the Communist Party of Ukraine (Soviet Union) members
Communist Party of Ukraine (Soviet Union) politicians
Central Committee of the Communist Party of the Soviet Union candidate members
Central Executive Committee of the Soviet Union members
Burials at Mariinsky Park
Mayors of Kharkiv